1980 in radio involved some significant events.


Events
 20 March – The pirate radio station Radio Caroline sinks.
 April – WDLM, a religious station based in East Moline, Illinois, adds an FM signal at 89.3 MHz. It acts as both a repeater of WDLM's AM signal (at 960 AM, which has been on the air since 1960) and adds additional programming.
 29 October – President Carter on a visit to Pittsburgh gives a nationally broadcast campaign interview to KDKA-AM of that city.

Debuts
Alex Bennett returns to his native San Francisco to host a comedy-oriented morning show for album-oriented rock station KMEL. The show will last for the next 17 years on three different area radio stations.

Closings
11 February – Sears Radio Theater ends its run on CBS. Episodes are rebroadcast later in 1980 on Mutual as Mutual Radio Theater.

Births
9 October – Sarah X Dylan, radio and television personality in Portland, Oregon, United States, where she produced The Rick Emerson Show on KUFO

Deaths
7 January – Irene Beasley, American singer and master of ceremonies best known for her work on old-time radio (born 1904).
29 January – Jimmy Durante, American singer, pianist, comedian and actor (born 1893).
1 February – Jack Bailey, American actor and daytime game show host (born 1907). 
4 February – Art Ballinger, American actor, announcer and commercial spokesman (born 1898).
11 April – Florence Lake, American actress (born 1904).
24 July – Peter Sellers, English actor, comedian and radio personality (born 1925).
22 August – Norman Shelley, English radio actor (born 1903).
20 October – Isobel Barnett, British broadcasting personality (born 1918; suicide).
8 December – Charles Parker, English documentary producer (born 1919).

See also
Radio broadcasting

References

 
Radio by year